Joseph Wharton (March 3, 1826 – January 11, 1909) was an American industrialist. He was involved in mining, manufacturing and education. He founded the Wharton School at the University of Pennsylvania, co-founded the Bethlehem Steel company, and was one of the founders of Swarthmore College.

Early years 
Wharton was born in Philadelphia in 1826, the fifth child of ten in a liberal Hicksite Quaker family. His parents, William Wharton and Deborah Fisher Wharton, were both from prominent early American immigrant families of Quaker descent. Both of Wharton's grandmothers were named Hannah and were from Newport, Rhode Island. Wharton's maternal grandfather, Samuel R. Fisher, ran a prosperous mercantile business and shipping packet line between Philadelphia and London, and his grandmother, Hannah Rodman, was a descendant of Thomas Cornell, the ancestor of Ezra Cornell, who founded Cornell University. Wharton's youth was spent in the family's house near Spruce and 4th Streets in central Philadelphia and at the country mansion "Bellevue". Wharton's father was a typical gentleman, and did not hold a regular job because he had several illnesses, but oversaw his estate, served on the Philadelphia School Board, and was active with his wife, Deborah, in the Hicksite ministry. From their country estate, the family often went to the nearby Schuylkill River, visited neighboring estates such as Deborah's grandfather Joshua Fisher's The Cliffs, and went on weekend horse and carriage excursions to the countryside surrounding Philadelphia, sometimes attending the smaller Quaker Meetings.

Schooling 
As a boy, Wharton attended two Quaker boarding schools in the towns outside of Philadelphia and also several private schools in the city. Between the age of 14 and 16, Wharton was prepared for college by a private tutor. However, when he was 16, he went on the advice of his parents to mature and learn the life of a farmer, a common dream of city-born Hicksite Quakers at the time, and boarded with Joseph and Abigail Walton on their family farm near West Chester, Pennsylvania, for three years. By that time, Wharton had matured to a strong frame,  in stature, with a serious but cheerful outlook. He was accomplished in sports such as horseback riding, swimming, and rowing on the Schuylkill River. During the winter Wharton returned to his parents' home in Philadelphia and studied languages such as French and German, which were useful for learning about science and technology. He also studied chemistry at the Philadelphia laboratory of Martin Hans Boyè. Wharton and his brothers in their early years identified with inventors and builders such as Cyrus McCormick and Samuel F. B. Morse.

Starting in business 

When he was 19, Wharton apprenticed with an accountant for two years and became proficient in business methods and bookkeeping. At 21, he partnered with his older brother Rodman to start a business manufacturing white lead. Wharton's chemistry mentor, Martin Boye, had developed a method to refine cottonseed oil and the Wharton brothers tried but failed to develop a profitable method to extract it. In 1849 Wharton started a business manufacturing bricks using a patented machine which pressed dry clay into forms. There was substantial competition in the brick business, which was affected by cyclical business swings, and after several trips to sell bricks and the brick-making machines, Wharton found the prospects for making good profits were dim. However, from the endeavor he gained valuable experience. In 1853, Wharton joined the Pennsylvania and Lehigh Zinc Company near Bethlehem, Pennsylvania, first managing the mining operation and later the zinc oxide works. Wharton proved himself by negotiating a new charter for the works, and in the difficult financial environment of 1857–1858 he took over control of the zinc works, managing it carefully so that it turned a profit. In 1860 Wharton, after some challenging negotiations with the directors of the company, developed for Lehigh Zinc the first plant to manufacture metallic zinc in America. Looking into the next business cycle, he leased the plant for four years and eventually made a robust profit from the sale of metallic zinc, used in making brass, which picked up in the Civil War years.

Family life 
Wharton married Anna Corbit Lovering, a fellow Quaker and the younger sister of his brother Charles' wife, in 1854 in a Quaker ceremony. After living with Anna's family for several months the couple moved into a house belonging to his mother near 12th and Walnut Streets in Philadelphia, but Anna often continued to stay with her parents while Joseph was out of town. She preferred a life of comfort but evidently did not wish to stifle his ambition. During this time Wharton lived a spartan life, boarding at a hotel and managing the zinc works in Bethlehem, and Anna cared for their first child Joanna at their home in Philadelphia. Although Joseph returned as often as possible and they communicated often by letter, they felt much stress during this period and their marriage suffered. Later, when Joseph was more secure in his job manufacturing zinc, Anna and Joanna came to live with him in Bethlehem, where they lived a happier life for two years, partaking in social events and exploring the local rivers and countryside. After Wharton sold his interest in zinc, they returned to Philadelphia, and although he often traveled to oversee his properties or develop business connections, he never again lived apart from the family. He purchased a country estate several miles north of Philadelphia, called "Ontalauna", and bought a donkey for their three children, Joanna, Mary, and Anna, to ride along on horseback expeditions. Wharton often studied at night or played history games with the children.

Nickel manufacture 
Hoping to profit from the use of nickel in coins, Wharton in 1863 sold his interest in zinc and started the manufacture of nickel at Camden, New Jersey, taking over a nickel mine and refining works at Nickel Mines, Pennsylvania.  The Camden plant was located on the east side of 10th Street, adjacent to Cooper Creek, and had several large brick buildings and smokestacks. Wharton renamed the Camden plant the American Nickel Works, and his office there became his center of operations. However, the use of nickel in coinage was temporarily halted, and soon the Camden plant burned. Wharton rebuilt it in 1868 and made excellent profits from producing nickel because it became favored for coinage. Wharton won wide acclaim for his malleable nickel, the first in the world, and also for nickel magnets, and received the Gold Medal at the Paris Exposition of 1878. His factory produced the only nickel in the US and a significant fraction of the world supply. Eventually, the surface deposits at the Gap mine were depleted and Wharton was obliged to purchase nickel ore from a mine in Sudbury, Ontario, Canada. This experience was a challenge to Wharton, who learned about market economics and protection when foreign nickel manufacturers opposed his nickel purchasing and manufacture efforts. Wharton by then had learned the value of meeting personally with his managers and regularly inspecting the mines and manufacturing plants with them. He was successful because he worked hard to increase efficiency and profitability of the businesses he acquired, and energetically pursued markets for his products. Wharton made a robust profit from his nickel business over its 40-year duration, but by 1900 its outlook was fading due to foreign competition. Wharton and a group of other United States and Canadian nickel enterprises formed the International Nickel Company (Inco) in 1902. He sold his American Nickel Works in Camden and the Gap mine for a share in the new company, and was named one of the dozen board members. By this time the profitability of his business empire did not depend on the manufacture of nickel because he had already diversified into other profitable businesses.

Estate, water and New Jersey 
In 1854 Philadelphia increased its tax base by expanding its borders to include the surrounding suburbs, and after the Civil War, its population swelled. By 1870 the Centennial Exposition was upcoming, and Philadelphia was rapidly changing. It was suffering from a water crisis because it required more water, but there was no appropriate method for water purification and the Delaware and Schuylkill rivers were heavily polluted. Philadelphia's typhoid fever rate was among the highest in the nation, and most well-to-do families drank bottled spring water. The Wharton family's "Bellevue" estate, along with several others nearby that had been annexed into the city, was threatened with condemnation by the city for the construction of a new reservoir to hold potable water. Wharton saw a potential solution to both of these problems. He started purchasing land in southern New Jersey in the 1870s, eventually acquiring  in the Pinelands which contained an aquifer replenished by several rivers and lakes. The water from the Pinelands was relatively pure and he planned to export the water to Philadelphia. Wharton suggested that a city-controlled company could develop the necessary water mains and pump, funded by public purchase of stocks and bonds. There was opposition to the plan by others in Philadelphia and in New Jersey, and eventually, a law was passed in New Jersey preventing the export of water. The Wharton Bellevue estate was taken by the city, but the planned reservoir was never constructed, because of local politics and also because by 1890 water could be purified by filtration, obviating the need for an extra reservoir. Instead, the estate was sold to developers for construction of new housing for the newly organized industry nearby in North Philadelphia.

Summers 
Wharton's family had long roots in Newport, Rhode Island and he summered there with his extended family at the family house on Washington Street for many decades. When his children were young, Wharton enjoyed taking them rowing and sailing about the harbor. Often they would sail across the bay to Conanicut Island to picnic and explore the cliffs and beaches. In 1882 Joseph Wharton, his brother Charles, and other friends purchased plots in Jamestown, Rhode Island, across the bay from Newport and built summer homes there. Wharton constructed Horsehead-Marbella, a large stone house with a prominent tower overlooking the entrance to Narragansett Bay. He named the house "Marbella" but it was later called "Horsehead" after a rock formation on the cliffs below that looked like the head of a horse from a certain angle. The family was active in swimming and sailing, and the grandchildren enjoyed playing on the rocks and tidal pools below the house. Wharton and his wife Anna enjoyed socializing but preferred the company of a few selected people to many, and avoided balls and late hours. In the early 1890s, the government surveyed sites on Conanicut Island for a coastal fort that would command the entrance to the bay, and took some of Wharton's property along with other nearby summer estates, starting construction of nearby Fort Wetherill in 1896. The fort took several years to finish and during this time the Horsehead property continued to be threatened so Wharton purchased an additional  in the southern part of Jamestown including several farms, one at Beavertail in 1899. The threatened action did not happen and the Horsehead property still stands today.

Business empire 
Wharton traveled widely and became involved in many industrial enterprises such as mines, factories and railroads. He started several enterprises on the South New Jersey property, including a menhaden fish factory that produced oil and fertilizer, a modern forestry planting operation, and cranberry and sugar beet farms. Wharton also purchased land containing ore and an iron furnace in northern New Jersey at Port Oram, New Jersey (now Wharton, New Jersey) which was located close to the Morris Canal and railroads. He purchased a coal mine in western Pennsylvania, constructing for the workers a town of 85 houses and stores along the railway. He also purchased coal land in West Virginia, iron and copper mines in Michigan, and gold mines in Arizona and Nevada. Wharton became involved in the Reading and Lehigh railroads and several others, arranging spur lines with the railroads to carry ore and finished metal products. He maintained an extensive business correspondence and in later life maintained this practice through his vacations. Wharton was a colleague of leaders such as inventors Ezra Cornell, Elias Howe and Thomas Edison, and entrepreneur Cornelius Vanderbilt. His management style evolved throughout the latter half of the 1800s, making use of new technology for communication, transportation, and production, so that he controlled many industries profitably on a larger scale than was previously possible.

Bethlehem Steel 
Through the 1870s Wharton began to buy into Bethlehem Iron Company which produced pig iron and steel rails, gradually investing more of his own time and energy, but without involvement in the day-to-day operations. He became the largest shareholder with a position on the board of managers, and eventually purchased a controlling share of the company. In 1885, Wharton successfully bid a contract with the United States Navy for forged steel armor, and in 1886 he visited England (Whitworth Co.) and France (Schneider Co.) to research the designs for a plant to forge steel of higher quality. With these designs, Bethlehem Iron built the first plant to forge high-strength steel in America. The plant fabricated armor plates and guns for warships. Similar contracts gave the company, renamed the Bethlehem Steel Company, a consistent source of income, and Wharton made slow but steady profits. In 1901 he sold the company but continued to be the largest producer of pig iron in the country because of his extensive iron and coal mines and refining works.

Washington politics and distinguished guests 
Over several decades, Wharton lobbied successfully in Washington, D.C. for tariff laws protecting U.S. manufacturing. He was a defender of large business and evolved into a staunch Republican. He successfully lobbied for the use of nickel in the U.S. coinage, but his lobbying for nickel tariffs was only partially successful, probably because he had a virtual monopoly on production in the U.S. In 1873 the world was in a very trying economic depression and many industrial firms went bankrupt. Wharton became widely known as a leader of the Industrial League of manufacturing concerns, and the main lobbyist and President of the American Iron and Steel Institute. He was a personal friend and consultant with several presidents including Grant, Hayes, and Harrison. Wharton entertained distinguished internationally known guests such as biologists Thomas Huxley and Joseph Leidy, astronomer Samuel Langley, scientist Lord Kelvin, Senators James Blaine and Justin Morrill, industrialist Andrew Carnegie, and metallurgist Alfred Krupp. Wharton successfully lobbied for a bill in the Pennsylvania General Assembly supporting Limited Partnerships to allow more participation of capital in enterprises with risk.

Science 
Wharton was a scientist interested in the natural world, and wrote scientific papers on a variety of topics including astronomy and metallurgy, presenting several to the American Philosophical Society. He has been elected to the Society in 1869. In the winter of 1883–1884 there was a period of several months when sunsets were extraordinarily red worldwide. Some imagined that the red color was from dust dispersed in the atmosphere worldwide by the volcano Krakatoa which had recently erupted. Others imagined that the reddish hue might come from iron and steel furnaces because they were known to create a reddish-brown dust. Wharton was curious, and one morning when a light snow was falling, collected some from a field near his house, melted and evaporated it, studying the remaining particles under a microscope which he had on hand for metallurgy. The particles looked like "irregular, flattish, blobby" glass particles. He visited a ship that had come to port in Philadelphia, having sailed from Manila, a course that had taken it a few hundred miles from Krakatoa. It had been slowed by a huge amount of pumice floating in the ocean, evidently spewed out by Krakatoa. Wharton obtained some pumice from one of the ship's crew, compared it with the dust he had collected, and found almost identical particles. In 1893 he presented a paper about the dust to the 150th anniversary meeting of the American Philosophical Society. Wharton also wrote a paper about the use of the Doppler effect on the color of light emitted by binary stars to determine their distance from Earth, and made the analogy to a train whistle which changes tone as it passes. Wharton was one of the most accomplished metallurgists in America during his lifetime, certainly the most widely known.

Swarthmore College 
In 1864, Wharton along with his mother Deborah Fisher Wharton and a group of like-minded Hicksite Quakers from Philadelphia, Baltimore, and New York were the founders of Swarthmore College, a Hicksite Quaker college outside Philadelphia. Swarthmore filled an important need of a college where both men and women could receive a high-quality education in the tradition of Friends not dominated by religion. Wharton gave generously, building a Friends Meeting on campus and also contributing to a science building. His mother Deborah served on the Swarthmore Board of Managers from 1862–1870, and Joseph served on the board from 1870–1909, and from 1883–1907 as its president. He was often on campus and gave many commencement addresses.

Wharton School 
Wharton wrote extensively on economic matters, including protective tariffs and business cycles.  In the last half of the 19th century, business education typically consisted mainly of training on the job or an apprenticeship. Wharton conceived of a school that would teach how to develop and run a business, and to anticipate and deal with the cycles of economic activity. In 1881 Wharton donated $100,000 to the University of Pennsylvania to found a "School of Finance and Economy" for this purpose. He specified that the Wharton School faculty advocate economic protectionism, as he had when lobbying for American businesses in Washington. However, the school soon began to broaden its outlook to a global one and to teach other disciplines such as politics and the developing social sciences, and introduced the teaching of business management and finance as these disciplines gradually coalesced. The Wharton School was the first to include such a practical focus on business, finance, and management. During its first century through the present day, it was and is widely known as one of the most prominent schools of business in the world. In 2023, the Wharton School fell off of the Financial Times' 2023 MBA rankings for the first time since the ranking's inception.

Last years and death

Wharton was active to near the end of his life both physically and in business affairs. Until he was 72, he skated with guests on the pond at his Ontalauna estate near Philadelphia and would often go on walks with his family after dinner. Throughout his life he partook in physical exercise, total abstinence from tobacco, and restricted use of even mild alcoholic drinks. When he was nearly 80, he visited his Nevada silver mine by canoeing down the Colorado River and descending into the mine in a bucket, and when he was 81, he traveled to Germany with his grandson, Joseph Wharton Lippincott, to visit Kaiser Wilhelm II and had dinner on the kaiser's yacht. He continued to oversee his holdings in coke manufacture in Pennsylvania and iron in northern New Jersey.

He read widely in literature and was an accomplished poet.  Many of his poems were inspired by trips abroad.  He wrote "Stewardson's Yarn" after an 1873 visit to Europe, "The Royal Palm" and "The 'Sweet Reasonableness' of a Yankee Philistine in Cuba" after a visit to Cuba to inspect mines there, and "Mexico" after an 1889 visit to the country of the same name.  A domestic journey, to Nevada to see his gold mines there, resulted in "The Buttes of the Canyon".

In 1907 he was incapacitated by stroke and gradually worsened until his death in 1909.  He is buried in the family plot at Laurel Hill Cemetery in Philadelphia.

Legacy
Wharton's daughter Joanna married noted Philadelphia publisher, J. Bertram Lippincott, in 1887 and named their eldest son Joseph Wharton Lippincott; Anna married Harrison S. Morris, who was associated with the Pennsylvania Academy of the Fine Arts, in 1896; but Mary never married. In 1908, Wharton created Fisher Park, a  park in the Olney neighborhood in Philadelphia, donating the land on his deathbed to the City of Philadelphia as a "Christmas gift". The Wharton family continued to hold gatherings at the family mansion at Batsto, New Jersey until the 1920s, and in 1954 sold Wharton's vast Pinelands properties in southern New Jersey to the state, forming the core of Wharton State Forest.

A Joseph Wharton 18-cent commemorative postal stamp was issued in 1981, the 100th anniversary of the founding of the Wharton School.  Wharton was inducted into the Junior Achievement U.S. Business Hall of Fame in 2004.

The borough of Wharton, New Jersey, originally known as Port Oram, changed its name to honor Joseph Wharton.

He is the great-great-great grandfather of former UCLA and former Miami Dolphins quarterback Josh Rosen.

Footnotes

References 
 Yates, W. Ross. Joseph Wharton: Quaker Industrial Pioneer. Bethlehem: Lehigh University Press, 1987. .
  Lippincott, Joanna Wharton. Biographical Memoranda Concerning Joseph Wharton, 1826–1909 by His Daughter Joanna Wharton Lippincott. Philadelphia: J.B. Lippincott, 1909. Printed for private circulation.
 Joseph Wharton Family Papers, 1691–1962, Library of Swarthmore College, Swarthmore, Pennsylvania.
 Richardson, Charles Henry. Description of nickel mining in Economic Geology. McGraw-Hill, 1913.
 Weigley, Russell F. (editor), Nicholas B. Wainwright, and Edwin Wolf, 2nd (associate editors).Philadelphia: A 300 Year History. New York: W.W. Norton, 1982. .
 Wharton, Joseph. Article on nickel magnets in American Journal of Science, 1877, p 415.
 Wharton, Joseph. Article on zinc manufacture in American Journal of Science, Sept 1871, p 168.
 Wharton, Joseph. "Dust from the Krakatoa Eruption of 1883", pp. 343–345 in Proceedings commemorative of the 150th anniversary of the American Philosophical Society Held at Philadelphia for Promoting Useful Knowledge, May 22–26, 1893, American Philosophical Society, 1894, digitized by Google.
 Wharton, Joseph. Letter to the editor on plans for water supply, Evening Bulletin, June 17, 1891.
 Wharton, Joseph. "On Two Peculiar Products from Nickel Manufacture", pp. 365–368 in American Journal of Science and Arts, Series II, 49:365–368, digitized by Google.
 Wharton, Joseph. "Speculations Upon a Possible Method of Determining the Distance of Certain Variably Colored Stars", American Journal of Science and Arts: Series II, Vol 40:190–192, digitized by Google.
 "Hall of Fame: Joseph Wharton 1826–1909", Engineering & Mining Journal, February, 1998.

External links 

 Historic and Architectural Resources of Jamestown, Rhode Island at the Jamestown Philomenian Library
 Philadelphia Architects and Buildings: For the location of Bellevue mansion, search for Bellevue as a guest  
 Plan of Wharton's American Nickel Works in Camden, NJ, Survey #23442345 by Hexamer and Son, Inc. 419 Walnut St, Philadelphia, Pennsylvania, 1890
 Wharton School website
Biography at virtualology.com under his great-great-grandfather, Thomas Wharton (1664-1718).

American company founders
American steel industry businesspeople
1826 births
1909 deaths
American businesspeople in the coal industry
American business theorists
American chief executives
American manufacturing businesspeople
American metallurgists
American philanthropists
American Quakers
American railway entrepreneurs
Bethlehem Steel people
Businesspeople in agriculture
Cornell family
Pennsylvania Republicans
Businesspeople from Philadelphia
Swarthmore College people
Wharton family
Wharton School of the University of Pennsylvania people
19th-century American businesspeople